Matthew Howard Dunn (born 25 November 1968) is a British spy novelist, media talent. creative adviser, and previously an MI6 intelligence officer. According to his publicists his time in the intelligence services included experience with specialized units of the British SAS and SBS as well as joint operations with MI5, GCHQ, the CIA, and BND.

Biography
He read politics and economics at the University of East Anglia before undertaking a PhD in international relations at the University of Cambridge.

Works

Novels
Spycatcher (2011), William Morrow
Sentinel: A Spycatcher Novel (2012), William Morrow
Slingshot: A Spycatcher Novel (2013), William Morrow
Counter Spy: A Spycatcher Novella (2014), William Morrow
Dark Spies: A Spycatcher Novel (2014), William Morrow
Spy Trade: A Spycatcher Novella (2015), William Morrow
The Spy House: A Spycatcher Novel (2015), William Morrow
A Soldier's Revenge: A Spycatcher Novel (2016), William Morrow
Act of Betrayal: A Spycatcher Novel (2017), William Morrow
The Spy Whisperer: A Ben Sign Novel (2018), Independent
The Russian Doll: A Ben Sign Novel (2018), Independent
The Fifth Man: A Ben Sign Novel (2019), Independent
The Kill House: A Ben Sign Novella (2019), AmazonThe Spy Thief: A Ben Sign Novel (2021),Amazon

References

1968 births
Living people
Alumni of the University of East Anglia
Alumni of the University of Cambridge
English thriller writers